Clinidium guatemalenum is a species of ground beetle in the subfamily Rhysodinae. It was described by David Sharp in 1899. It is endemic to Guatemala.

Clinidium guatemalenum measure  in length.

References

Clinidium
Beetles of Central America
Endemic fauna of Guatemala
Beetles described in 1899